Jesper Roesen (born May 2, 1975 in Copenhagen) is a retired Danish taekwondo practitioner, who competed in the men's featherweight category. Considering one of Europe's top taekwondo players in his own division, Roesen held three European titles (1996, 1998, and 2005), obtained two silver medals at the World Championships (1999 and 2001), and represented his nation Denmark at the 2004 Summer Olympics. Throughout his sporting career, Roesen trained full-time for Hwarang Taekwondo Klub in Rødovre, under his personal coach and master Bjarne Johansen.

Roesen began his taekwondo training with Master Kytu’s Hwarang Taekwondo Klub at fourteen years old. In 1996, Roesen's sporting career thrived with his first ever European title in Helsinki, Finland, and then continued to add one more in Eindhoven, Netherlands two years later. Roesen also permitted a chance to represent his nation Denmark at the World Taekwondo Championships, where he placed second behind South Korea's No Hyun-goo in 1999 and U.S. fighter Steven López in 2001.

At the 2004 Summer Olympics in Athens, Roesen qualified for the Danish squad in the men's featherweight class (68 kg), by registering his entry and placing third from the European Olympic Qualifying Tournament in Baku, Azerbaijan. Roesen got off to a flying start with a seamless 11–10 victory over Argentina's two-time Olympian Alejandro Hernando, before ending his Olympic debut by hopelessly losing the quarterfinal match 11–13 to South Korea's Song Myeong-seob.

In 2005, Roesen brought home his third gold medal in the final against Dutch fighter Tommy Mollet at the European Championships in Riga, Latvia, marking the end of his illustrious, fifteen-year-old taekwondo career.

References

External links
 
 
 
 

1975 births
Living people
Danish male taekwondo practitioners
Olympic taekwondo practitioners of Denmark
Taekwondo practitioners at the 2004 Summer Olympics
World Taekwondo Championships medalists
European Taekwondo Championships medalists
Sportspeople from Copenhagen
20th-century Danish people
21st-century Danish people